The Royal Mint of Malaysia was the national mint of Malaysia. The original name was Kilang Wang Bank owned by Boustead Mint Sdn Bhd, before it become private and was renamed Royal Mint of Malaysia on October 1st, 1998. It was located at the Kompleks Kilang Wang Bank Negara Malaysia in Shah Alam. It was established in 2003 to strike coins of Malaysia until 2006. The 1967 Malaysian coinage issue was struck at the Royal Mint in London.

See also
 Malaysian ringgit

References

External links
"Malaysian Mint". www.mintsoftheworld.com.
"Malaysia Coin". Malaysia Coin (in Malay).

Finance in Malaysia
Malaysia
2003 establishments in Malaysia